Jalan KLIA 1, Federal Route 182, is the third highway in Kuala Lumpur International Airport (KLIA), Malaysia. It is a main route to KLIA Charter Field Town or KLIA Town Centre. The Kilometre Zero is located at Nilai-KLIA Highway junctions.

Features

At most sections, the Federal Route 182 was built under the JKR R5 road standard, allowing maximum speed limit of up to 90 km/h.

List of interchanges

References

See also
KLIA Expressway
KLIA Outer Ring Road
KLIA East Road
Kuala Lumpur International Airport (KLIA)

Highways in Malaysia
Expressways and highways in the Klang Valley
Kuala Lumpur International Airport
Roads in Selangor